Wharf Holdings Ltd. v. United Int'l Holdings, Inc., 532 U.S. 588 (2001), was a United States Supreme Court case decided in 2001. The case concerned a provision of the Securities Exchange Act of 1934 dealing with manipulating and evading rules set by the SEC. The Court concluded that a secret understanding to violate an arrangement under the Act still constituted a violation, rejecting an argument that oral contracts were categorically excluded from the provision's coverage.

Background
In return for United International Holdings, Inc.'s assistance in preparing its application, contracts, system, and financing for a cable television system in Hong Kong, Wharf Holdings Ltd. orally granted United an option to buy 10% of stock in the system. The agreement was never written down. Ultimately, Wharf refused to allow United to exercise its option. United then sued Wharf in the United States District Court for the District of Colorado, claiming that Wharf violated the Securities Exchange Act of 1934, which prohibits using "any manipulative or deceptive device or contrivance...in connection with the purchase or sale of any security." Wharf's internal documents, which suggested that Wharf never intended to carry out its promise, supported United's claim. A jury found in United Holdings' favor, finding a violation of the 1934 Act. The Court of Appeals for the Tenth Circuit affirmed.

Opinion of the Court
Justice Stephen Breyer wrote the unanimous decision of the Court, which affirmed the Tenth Circuit. The Court held that an oral agreement to give an option to buy stock while secretly intending never to honor that option violates the Securities Exchange Act of 1934's prohibition of deceptive devices. Justice Breyer wrote for the Court that there was no "convincing reason to interpret the Act to exclude oral contracts as a class. The Act itself says that it applies to 'any contract' for the purchase or sale of a security." Under this reasoning, the Tenth Circuit was correct in affirming the jury's verdict, and Wharf Limited was found to have violated the 1934 Act.

See also
 Securities Exchange Act of 1934
 Securities fraud

References

External links

United States Supreme Court cases
2001 in United States case law
United States Supreme Court cases of the Rehnquist Court
United States securities case law